Harvey Public School District #38, also known as Harvey Public Schools or Harvey 38 is a school district based in Harvey, North Dakota.

Its schools are Harvey Elementary School and Harvey High School.

References

External links

 Harvey Public Schools

School districts in North Dakota
Education in Wells County, North Dakota